Annick Chapron (born 10 March 1949) is a former French racing cyclist. She won the French national road race title in 1971.

References

External links
 

1949 births
Living people
French female cyclists
Sportspeople from Côtes-d'Armor
Cyclists from Brittany